Mithavadi was a Malayalam-language newspaper published from Tellicherry and later from Calicut in Malabar, British India. It was established by T. Sivasankaran in 1907. Moorkoth Kumaran was the editor. He merged his Kerala Sanchari newspaper with Mithavadi. In 1913, C. Krishnan purchased the newspaper and published it from his Empire Press, Calicut. Mithavadi was particularly popular among the Thiyya community and was instrumental in pioneering tenant agitations in Malabar.

References 

Malayalam-language newspapers
Defunct newspapers published in India
Defunct Malayalam-language newspapers
Newspapers established in 1907